Johnny Perrin is a Canadian punk rock musician from Winnipeg, Manitoba, Canada. He is the former frontman of the Winnipeg ska band Grandpa's Army (1998–2000), which released an album in 2000 called G Sides and A Sides. In 2002, two members of Grandpa's Army, Sam Thompson and Alex Southern, made a documentary about Grandpa's Army, The Truth is Disgusting, which was released on YouTube. 

In 2000, Perrin recorded an EP, Pay To The Order Of, with the band TBA.

Perrin appeared in the 2004 Dogme 95 film The Smokestack Wager. In 2004, he recorded the EP Den of Iniquity with a Winnipeg band of the same name. In 2005, he played drums for The Brat Attack and that band's album From This Beauty Comes Chaos And Mayhem.
In 2012, he played drums for the Ottawa band Up 'N' Atom. He sang crew vocals on the 2013 Misery Signals album Absent Light.

Perrin is son of John Draper Perrin III, great-grandson of John Draper Perrin, and grandson of John Draper Perrin Jr. He works in management for the musical instrument retailer Long & McQuade.

Discography
 2000: G Sides and A Sides, Grandpa's Army, Borracho Records
 2000: Pay To The Order Of EP, TBA, Spock Attack Records
 2004: Den of Iniquity EP, Den of Iniquity, Independent
 2005: From This Beauty Comes Chaos And Mayhem, Brat Attack, Underground Operations

References

1983 births
Living people
Canadian punk rock singers
Canadian punk rock drummers
Canadian male drummers
Musicians from Winnipeg
21st-century Canadian drummers
21st-century Canadian male singers